Tom Logan (born 1953) is an American director, writer, producer, acting instructor, and former actor. Based in Los Angeles, he has directed a multitude of feature films and television shows, and directed hundreds national and international commercials.

Early life
Logan was born in Shreveport, Louisiana and attended the University of Arkansas for two years before earning a Bachelor of Arts degree in Theatre Arts from California State University, Northridge.

Career

One of his first assignments was directing/writing/producing many episodes of Real Stories of the Highway Patrol.

His feature film directing credits include Shakma, Dream Trap, The Night Brings Charlie, King's Ransom and Escape from Cuba.

Logan has also held acting roles in General Hospital, playing Gary on-and-off for 13 years. He also starred in Days of Our Lives and other soap operas.

Acting

In the eighties and nineties Logan appeared on dozens of TV shows including CHiPs, What's Happening!, The Hardy Boys, and James at 16. He has also starred in TV movies and commercials.

Logan also starred in many feature films and over 70 stage productions. In New York he starred in You're A Good Man, Charlie Brown, Mame, and Applause.

Other work
Prior to his acting career, Logan was an acting coach.

Logan headed the TV/Film & Commercial acting departments in Los Angeles at the American Film Institute (1981–88), and the American Academy of Dramatic Arts, West (1980–87).

Logan has written four books about acting: How to Act and Eat at the Same Time, Acting in the Million Dollar Minute and their respective sequels.

Logan is also an aviation enthusiast and owner of a Piper Arrow.

Logan also dedicates time helping young people who are interested in the entertainment industry. He is a collaborator with the Los Angeles-based Young Performers Studio.

Accolades

 1986 – Bronze Halo Award "Outstanding Contributions to the Entertainment Industry" For authoring his three (now 4) best-selling books for actors. Given annually by the Southern California Motion Picture Council. http://www.tomlogan.com/Director.htm
 1995 – Producers' Choice Award "Outstanding Direction of a Television Variety Program", 1995 Miss North America Pageant. http://www.tomlogan.com/Director.htm
 1999 – Best Director "Outstanding Achievement in Direction", Escape From Cuba New Star Discovery Awards. http://www.tomlogan.com/Director.htm Logan is a member of the Directors Guild of America, the Screen Actors Guild, American Federation of Television and Radio Artists, and Actors' Equity Association.

Bibliography

External links
 Official Website

References

1953 births
Writers from Shreveport, Louisiana
American television directors
Living people
University of Arkansas alumni
California State University, Northridge alumni
American aviators
Actors from Shreveport, Louisiana
Film directors from Louisiana